Stenolechia notomochla is a moth of the family Gelechiidae. It is found in Japan (Kyushu, Tsushima Island) and Korea.

The larvae feed on the shoots of Quercus dentata.

References

Moths described in 1935
Stenolechia